Plymouth is an unincorporated community in Putnam County, West Virginia, United States.

The town is located north of the mouth of Guano Creek on the Kanawha River along West Virginia Route 62.

The community was named after Plymouth, Pennsylvania, the native home of two mining officials.

Much of the community is now located within the Amherst-Plymouth Wildlife Management Area.

References

Unincorporated communities in Putnam County, West Virginia
Unincorporated communities in West Virginia
Charleston, West Virginia metropolitan area
Coal towns in West Virginia
Populated places on the Kanawha River